Inaam Ghar Plus (English The Awards House) was a Geo Entertainment's presented television game show in Pakistan. It is based in Karachi and was hosted by Aamir Liaquat Hussain. The show returned on 13 February 2015  on Geo TV as part of Liaquat's return to the network.

Production 
After the success of Amaan Ramazan at Geo TV, channel announced on 17 January 2014 that registration has opened and will be done through SMS and the show will air two days a week. It will be aired live at Geo TV on Saturday and Thursday at 7:30 PM for three hours. The first episode of the show was aired on 18 January 2014.

Controversy 
On 27 June 2016, Pakistan Electronic Media Regulatory Authority (PEMRA) barred Aamir Liaquat from hosting his Ramadan show 'Inam Ghar' for three days on Geo Entertainment, which showed a reenactment by the show's host of a girl committing suicide.

On 28 June 2016, the Sindh High Court (SHC) nullified the PEMRA notification of imposing a three-day ban. But PEMRA approached the Supreme Court against the order of Sindh High Court (SHC) which had suspended its ban on the private channel's program. Later on 4 July 2016, a two-member bench of the Supreme Court directed PEMRA to conclude the matter about ban on Geo TV's program 'Inam Ghar' within a month.

Segments 
 Palna
 Mufta
 Zor Laga Ke Bhaiyya
 Pakistan Ideal
 Kaar War Lay Ja Mery Yaar
 Lagao Tukka
 Chulbulay
 Ghar Aye Mehman
 Chatt Patt Chatta Chat, Safa Chatt Fata Fat
 Khel Kar Jeeto
 Jhat Sawal Patt Jawab

See also 
 Bazm E Tariq Aziz
 Jeet Ka Dum
 Jeeto Pakistan

References

External links 
 Official website 
 

2014 Pakistani television series debuts
Geo TV original programming
Urdu-language television shows
Pakistani game shows